Marie Delarbre (born 22 January 1994) is a German ice hockey player and member of the German national team,  playing in the Swedish Women's Hockey League (SDHL) with Djurgårdens IF Hockey Dam.

She represented Germany at the IIHF Women's World Championships in 2013, 2015, 2017, 2019, 2021, and 2022.

References

External links

1994 births
Living people
Djurgårdens IF Hockey Dam players
German women's ice hockey forwards
German expatriate ice hockey people
German expatriate sportspeople in Sweden
German expatriate sportspeople in the United States
Merrimack Warriors women's ice hockey players
Minnesota Duluth Bulldogs women's ice hockey players
People from Aalen
Sportspeople from Füssen